Ismayil Khalid oglu Ibrahimli (born 13 February 1998) is an Azerbaijani footballer who plays as a attacking midfielder for Qarabağ FK and the Azerbaijan U21.

Club career
On 23 August 2015, Ibrahimli made his debut in the Azerbaijan Premier League for Shuvalan against Qarabağ.

He joined Azerbaijan First Division side MOIK Baku in summer 2017. He played well for the club during his one season in First Division, scoring five goals from 24 domestic appearances.

Ibrahimli signed a contract with Qarabağ FK in June 2018. He made his debut for the club on 18 August 2018 in an Azerbaijan Premier League match against Sabail, which Qarabağ won 2–0.

He made his European debut in 2019 against Sevilla in the UEFA Europa League group stage.

International career
On 5 January 2018, Ibrahimli was called up Azerbaijan U21 by Rashad Sadygov for a Antalya training camp.

He made his official debut for Azerbaijan U21 on 6 September 2018, against Israel U21 in a EURO-2019 U21 Championship qualification match a 1–1 draw at the Dalga Arena.

On 26 August 2020, Ibrahimli was called up Azerbaijan national football team by Gianni De Biasi for against Luxembourg and Cyprus matches.

Career statistics

Club

Honours
Qarabağ
 Azerbaijan Premier League: 2018–19, 2019–20

References

External links
 
 Ismayil Ibrahimli at www.uefa.com
 Ismayil Ibrahimli at qarabagh.com

1998 births
Living people
Azerbaijani footballers
Azerbaijan international footballers
Azerbaijan under-21 international footballers
Azerbaijan youth international footballers
AZAL PFK players
MOIK Baku players
Qarabağ FK players
Azerbaijan Premier League players
Association football midfielders